Bellulia incognita is a moth of the family Erebidae first described by Michael Fibiger in 2008. It is known from Laos, in Southeast Asia.

References

Micronoctuini
Taxa named by Michael Fibiger
Moths of Asia